Victor Martin (September 30, 1903 - December 26, 1950) was a Canadian politician who represented the electoral district of Nipissing in the Legislative Assembly of Ontario from 1945 to 1948. He was a member of the Ontario Liberal Party. He was born in 1903 to Ovide Martin and Marie Beaulieu. He married Beatrice Turcotte.

He died in 1950 and was buried at Bonfield.

References

External links
 

1903 births
1950 deaths
Ontario Liberal Party MPPs
People from Nipissing District